KPLN (106.7 FM) is a commercial radio station in Lockwood, Montana, broadcasting to the Billings, Montana area.

KPLN airs a hot adult contemporary music format branded as “Planet 106.7”.

History
On May 7, 2019 Connoisseur Media announced that it would sell its Billings cluster to Desert Mountain Broadcasting, an entity formed by Connoisseur Billings general manager Cam Maxwell. The sale closed on July 31, 2019.

References

External links
Official Website

PLN
Modern adult contemporary radio stations
Hot adult contemporary radio stations in the United States
Radio stations established in 2006